St. Xavier's English School is a private Catholic primary and secondary school, located in Chakradharpur, in the West Singhbhum district of the state of Jharkhand, India. The English-medium co-educational school was founded by the Society of Jesus in 1998, and is a non-aided minority institution owned and governed by the Jamshedpur Diocesan Educational Society.

Overview 
The school is owned and governed by the registered society of Jamshedpur Diocesan Educational Society and the responsibility of the day-to-day running of the school is vested in the principal appointed. The school caters to all the sections of society irrespective of their caste, creed and religion. It is a non-aided minority institution which solely depends on the monthly fees for its maintenance and day to day expenses. Hence fees have to be adjusted from time to time to keep up with the running costs of the school and salaries to the staff.

Due to COVID-19 pandemic, in July 2020 the school commenced delivering education via its online portal.

History 
St. Xavier's English School prepares students for the Indian Certificate of Secondary Education (ICSE).

It had its small beginning in Christ the King Church, Chakradharpur campus in the year 1998. The school started with nine children from std KG. Since the lack of infrastructure in church campus it was shifted to new place to provide better education facilities in year 2006. The purpose of this school is to give a strong foundation in English to all the students of this locality. St. Xavier's English School is a Catholic school and it draws its inspiration and guidance from the life and teachings of Jesus Christ.

See also

 List of Jesuit schools
 List of schools in Jharkhand

References

External links

Jesuit secondary schools in India
Jesuit primary schools in India
Educational institutions established in 1998
1998 establishments in Bihar
West Singhbhum district
Christian schools in Jharkhand